Dinner Party or The Dinner Party may refer to:

 A type of party or formal dinner
 The Dinner Party, an installation artwork by Judy Chicago
 The Dinner Party (play), by Neil Simon
 Dinner Party (EP) - an eponymous recording by a supergroup of 9th Wonder, Robert Glasper, Terrace Martin, and Kamasi Washington
 Dinner Party (play), by Pier Vittorio Tondelli
 "Dinner Party" (The Office)
 "The Dinner Party" (Seinfeld)
 "The Dinner Party" (Dynasty)
 "Dinner Party", a The Ren & Stimpy Show episode
 Dinner Party, a short film by Lisa Cholodenko
 The Dinner Party (talk show), a live arts talk show hosted by Elysabeth Alfano
 The Dinner Party (The Vampire Diaries), an episode of the TV series The Vampire Diaries
 Dinner Party Wars, a Canadian show that originally aired on Food Network Canada and was judged by Corbin Tomaszeski and Anthea Turner
 "The Dinner Party", a painting by Sam Walsh, inspired by Millais' Pre-Raphaelite painting Isabella
 "Dinner Party" (The Brak Show), a 2002 episode